Sokos is a chain of department stores in Finland that is part of the S Group, which also operates the hotel chain, Sokos Hotels.

Department stores 
 Helsinki (centre)
 Helsinki (Kaari)
 Hämeenlinna
 Joensuu
 Jyväskylä
 Kajaani
 Kotka
 Kouvola
 Kuopio
 Lahti
 Lohja
 Mikkeli
 Oulu (Shopping centre Valkea)
 Pori
 Porvoo
 Raisio (Mylly (Engl: "Mill") shopping center)
 Salo
 Savonlinna
 Tampere
 Turku (Wiklund)

External links 

Official website 

Department stores of Finland
Retail companies of Finland